A single-chain variable fragment (scFv) is not actually a fragment of an antibody, but instead is a fusion protein of the variable regions of the heavy (VH) and light chains (VL) of immunoglobulins, connected with a short linker peptide of ten to about 25 amino acids. The linker is usually rich in glycine for flexibility, as well as serine or threonine for solubility, and can either connect the N-terminus of the VH with the C-terminus of the VL, or vice versa.
This protein retains the specificity of the original immunoglobulin, despite removal of the constant regions and the introduction of the linker. The image to the right shows how this modification usually leaves the specificity unaltered.

These molecules were created to facilitate phage display, where it is highly convenient to express the antigen-binding domain as a single peptide. As an alternative, scFv can be created directly from subcloned heavy and light chains derived from a hybridoma. ScFvs have many uses, e.g., flow cytometry, immunohistochemistry, and as antigen-binding domains of artificial T cell receptors (chimeric antigen receptor).

Unlike monoclonal antibodies, which are often produced in mammalian cell cultures, scFvs are more often produced in bacteria cell cultures such as E. coli.

Purification
Single-chain variable fragments lack the constant Fc region found in complete antibody molecules, and, thus, the common binding sites (e.g., protein G) cannot be used to purify antibodies. These fragments can often be purified or immobilized using protein L, since protein L interacts with the variable region of kappa light chains.  More commonly, scientists incorporate a six histidine tag on the c-terminus of the scFv molecule and purify them using immobilized metal affinity chromatography (IMAC). Some scFv can also be captured by protein A if they contain a human VH3 domain.

Bivalent and trivalent scFvs

Divalent (or bivalent) single-chain variable fragments (di-scFvs, bi-scFvs) can be engineered by linking two scFvs. This can be done by producing a single peptide chain with two VH and two VL regions, yielding tandem scFvs. Another possibility is the creation of scFvs with linker peptides that are too short for the two variable regions to fold together (about five amino acids), forcing scFvs to dimerize. This type is known as diabodies. Diabodies have been shown to have dissociation constants up to 40-fold lower than corresponding scFvs, meaning that they have a much higher affinity to their target. Consequently, diabody drugs could be dosed much lower than other therapeutic antibodies and are capable of highly specific targeting of tumors in vivo. Still shorter linkers (one or two amino acids) lead to the formation of trimers, so-called triabodies or tribodies. Tetrabodies have also been produced. They exhibit an even higher affinity to their targets than diabodies.

All of these formats can be composed from variable fragments with specificity for two different antigens, in which case they are types of bispecific antibodies. The furthest developed of these are bispecific tandem di-scFvs, known as bi-specific T-cell engagers (BiTE antibody constructs).

Examples
 Pexelizumab, a scFv binding to component 5 of the complement system and designed to reduce side effects of cardiac surgery
 C6.5, a diabody targeting HER2/neu found in some breast cancers
 Brolucizumab, a scFV binding to VEGF-A and used to treat wet age-related macular degeneration

References

.